The Spring City Metro Post, or Chuncheng Ditie bao, was a Kunming-based Chinese-language morning newspaper published in China. It was officially founded on December 26, 2012.  as a subsidiary of Kunming Press Media Group (昆明报业传媒集团).

History
On the first day of the release of the Spring City Metro Post, 200,000 copies of the newspaper were distributed free of charge throughout Kunming for 3 days. 

On January 1, 2019, the Post ceased publication.

References

Defunct newspapers published in China
Publications established in 2012
2012 establishments in China
Publications disestablished in 2019